"Prince Robert" is one of the 305 ballads collected by Francis James Child during the late nineteenth century.

Prince Robert may also refer to:

 HMCS Prince Robert (F56), a sister ship of HMCS Prince David (F89)
 Prince Robert, Duke of Chartres (1840–1910), a grandson of King Louis-Philippe of France
 Robert I of Capua (died 1120), ruling Prince of Capua
 Robert II of Capua (died 1156), ruling Prince of Capua
 Robert III of Capua (1153–1158), Prince of Capua, as son of William I of Sicily
 Robert, Prince of Taranto (1299?–1364), holder of various titles, including Prince of Taranto, King of Albania, Prince of Achaea, and Emperor of Constantinople
 Prince Robert of Luxembourg (born 1968), grandson of Charlotte, Grand Duchess of Luxembourg

See also
 King Robert (disambiguation)
 Prince Rupert (disambiguation)